Abdul Fatawu Dauda (born 6 April 1985), known as Fatau Dauda, is a Ghanaian professional footballer who plays as a goalkeeper for Legon Cities FC.

Club career
Dauda began his football career in 2004 with Ghana Division 1 League club Okwawu United, and in 2006 Dauda signed for Ghana Premier League club Ashanti Gold S.C. in his hometown Obuasi. Dauda was a member of the Ghana Premier League All Star Team 2007. On 5 July 2008, Dauda was nominated as Goalkeeper of the Year 2008 in Ghana.

Dauda moved to South Africa to play for Orlando Pirates in 2013. A backup for Senzo Meyiwa, he played only three matches at the Premier Soccer League and left the club for Chippa United the following season. After only two matches, Dauda left the club after not being paid.

On 1 October 2014, Dauda returned to Ashanti Gold.

In December 2016, Dauda joined two-time African Champions Enyimba International F.C.

International career
Dauda was in the Ghana national team squad for the 2008 Africa Cup of Nations, and was the first choice keeper for the 2013 Africa Cup of Nations edition of the tournament.

Career statistics

International

References

External links

1985 births
Living people
People from Obuasi
Ghanaian footballers
Ghanaian expatriate footballers
Association football goalkeepers
Ghana international footballers
2008 Africa Cup of Nations players
2013 Africa Cup of Nations players
2014 FIFA World Cup players
2015 Africa Cup of Nations players
2017 Africa Cup of Nations players
Ashanti Gold SC players
Okwawu United players
Orlando Pirates F.C. players
Chippa United F.C. players
Enyimba F.C. players
Ghanaian expatriate sportspeople in South Africa
Ghanaian expatriate sportspeople in Nigeria
Expatriate soccer players in South Africa
Expatriate footballers in Nigeria
South African Premier Division players
Legon Cities F.C. players